List of cities of each of the islands in the former Netherlands Antilles. Aruba left the Netherlands Antilles in 1986. Curaçao and Sint Maarten left in 2010, and the remaining islands are now part of the Caribbean Netherlands.

Island of Aruba

 Oranjestad*
 Noord
 San Nicolaas
 Santa Cruz
 Savaneta
 Palm Beach
 Paradera
 Lago Colony

Island of Bonaire

 Kralendijk*
 Rincón
 Antriol

Island of Curaçao

Barber
Lagún
Santa Rosa
Spaanse Water
Tera Corá
Willemstad*

Island of Saba
The Bottom*

Island of Sint Eustatius (Statia)
Oranjestad*

Island of Sint Maarten
 Philipsburg*
 Lower Prince's Quarter
 Cul de Sac
 Cole Bay
 Upper Prince's Quarter
 Little Bay
 Simpson Bay
 Lowlands

 * Capital of respective island.

References

Geography of the Netherlands Antilles
Netherlands Antilles-related lists